Dichomeris tostella is a moth in the family Gelechiidae. It was described by Stringer in 1930. It is found in Japan, Korea, and the Russian Far East.

The forewings are yellowish ochreous.

The larvae feed on Malus pumila var. dulcissima, Prunus persica, and Prunus mume.

References

Moths described in 1930
tostella